The 2019 North Lincolnshire Council election took place on 2 May 2019 to elect all 43 members of North Lincolnshire Council in England. This will be on the same day as other local elections.

The election resulted in the Conservative Party retaining control of the council.

Result

Ward results

Ashby

Axholme Central

Axholme North

Axholme South

Barton

Bottesford

Brigg & Wolds

Broughton & Appleby

Brumby

Burringham & Gunness

Burton Upon Stather & Winterton

Crosby & Park

Ferry

Frodingham

Kingsway with Lincoln Gardens

Ridge

Town

References

2019 English local elections
May 2019 events in the United Kingdom
2019
2010s in Lincolnshire